Huys is a surname. Notable people with this surname include:

 Auguste-Léopold Huys (1871–1938), French missionary
 Mario Huys (born 1959), Belgian triathlete
 Modest Huys (1874–1932), Flemish painter
 Pieter Huys (c.1519–c.1584), Flemish Renaissance painter. 
 Servaas Huys (1940–2016), Dutch politician
 Twan Huys (born 1964), Dutch journalist, television presenter and author